Royal E. Miller is an American television soap opera script writer. He earned a B.A. in literature & society and semiotics (honors) from Brown University, an M.F.A. in film direction and screenwriting from New York University, Tisch School of the Arts. He has also been the recipient of an ABC/Disney Daytime Writing Fellowship and served an appointment as a lecturer for two years in the undergraduate college at Harvard University.

Positions held
All My Children
 Script writer: 2000 - 2001

As the World Turns
 Script writer: 2001 - 2002

The City
 Script writer: 1996 - 1997

Guiding Light
 Script writer: 2003 - 2007

Port Charles
 Script writer: 1997 - 1999

Awards and nominations
Daytime Emmy Award
Win, 2007, Best Writing, Guiding Light
Nomination, 2005, Best Writing, Guiding Light
Nomination, 2003, Best Writing, As the World Turns
Win, 2002, Best Writing, As the World Turns
Nomination, 2001 & 2002, Best Writing, All My Children

Writers Guild of America Award
Nomination, 2006, Best Writing, Guiding Light
Win, 2004, Best Writing, Guiding Light
Win, 2001 & 2002, Best Writing, All My Children

External links

Miller
American male television writers
Year of birth missing (living people)
Brown University alumni
Tisch School of the Arts alumni
Harvard University staff
Living people
Writers Guild of America Award winners